Len Calligaro (June 24, 1921 – June 15, 2011) was a blocking back in the National Football League (NFL). He played with the New York Giants during the 1944 NFL season.

References

1921 births
2011 deaths
American football quarterbacks
New York Giants players
Wisconsin Badgers football players
People from Hurley, Wisconsin
Players of American football from Wisconsin